María del Carmen Guzmán Lozano (born 22 December 1961) is a Mexican politician from the National Action Party. From 2011 to 2012 she served as Deputy of the LXI Legislature of the Mexican Congress representing Puebla.

References

1961 births
Living people
Politicians from Puebla
Women members of the Chamber of Deputies (Mexico)
National Action Party (Mexico) politicians
21st-century Mexican politicians
21st-century Mexican women politicians
Deputies of the LXI Legislature of Mexico
Members of the Chamber of Deputies (Mexico) for Puebla